Gmina Wierzbica may refer to either of the following rural administrative districts in Poland:
Gmina Wierzbica, Lublin Voivodeship
Gmina Wierzbica, Masovian Voivodeship